The Coalition New Democratic Party of Quebec - Regroupement des militants syndicaux fielded twenty-one candidates in the 1976 Quebec provincial election, none of whom were elected.

Electoral divisions

References

1976